Samantha Massell (born January 15, 1990) is a New York-based American actress and singer notable for playing Hodel in the 2015 Broadway revival of Fiddler on the Roof. She has received positive reviews of her singing and acting performance.  Her genre is pop.

Early life
Massell attended Hunter College High School (where she interned for Lin-Manuel Miranda) and the University of Michigan, where she studied musical theater and English, and graduated Phi Beta Kappa.

Career
She made her Broadway debut at age 12 in La Boheme. She originated the role of Florika in Disney's The Hunchback of Notre Dame and performed in the cast album.

She played Rapunzel in the 2015 revival of Into the Woods at The Muny.

She won the role of Hodel in a 2015 revival of the classic Broadway show Fiddler on the Roof.

In 2021, Massell collaborated with other actors to produce an off-Broadway production of the musical entitled The Flamingo Kid.

In 2022, she appeared in the TV series Dynasty as Stacey Moore.

Filmography

References

External links
 

American musical theatre actresses
1990 births
Living people
University of Michigan alumni
People from New York (state)
Actresses from New York City
American child actresses
21st-century American women